The Fruit, sculpted in 1906, is the work of Antoine Bourdelle. The statue is an anatomical study of a nude female who stands confidently, with fruit cupped in her right hand, her left arm bent behind and her ankles crossed.

Gallery

References
 Dossier de l'Art N° 10, January/February 1993
 Bourdelle, by Ionel Jianou and Michel Dufet Edition Arted 1970
 Cléopâtre Bourdelle-Sevastos, Ma vie avec Bourdelle, Paris-Musées and Editions des Cendres, 2005

Sculptures by Antoine Bourdelle
1906 sculptures
Bronze sculptures in Paris
Bronze sculptures in the United States
1906 establishments in France
Statues in France